Richhill Football Club was an intermediate-level football club, which last played in the Intermediate B division of the Mid-Ulster Football League in Northern Ireland. The club was based in Richhill, County Armagh. In 2016, it merged with Broomhill F.C. to become Richhill A.F.C.

Honours

Intermediate honours
Mid-Ulster Football League: 1
2004–05

References 

1945 establishments in Northern Ireland
2016 disestablishments in Northern Ireland
Defunct association football clubs in Northern Ireland
Association football clubs in County Armagh
Association football clubs established in 1945
Association football clubs disestablished in 2016
Mid-Ulster Football League clubs